Bryan Corey Anger (born October 6, 1988) is an American football punter for the Dallas Cowboys of the National Football League (NFL). He was drafted by the Jacksonville Jaguars in the third round of the 2012 NFL Draft. He played college football at California.

Early years
Anger attended Camarillo High School. As a senior, he posted a 41.8-yard average, 11 punts downed inside the 20-yard line, 42 receptions for 678 yards and 6 touchdowns. He received SA Today All-American, EA Sports All-American, All-Far West team by SuperPrep, Prepstar All-West Region and Cal-Hi Sports first-team All-State honors. He was listed as the No. 2 punter in the country by Rivals.

College career
Anger accepted a football scholarship from the University of California, Berkeley. As a redshirt freshman for the Golden Bears, he registered a 43.1-yard punt average (sixth in school history) and had 26 punts downed inside the 20. Against Stanford University, he hit a 75-yard punt (tied for fifth in school history) and a career-long 76-yard punt (fourth in school history). Against Arizona State University, he hit a 72-yard punt. Against Arizona, he averaged 48.4 yards on seven attempts. Against Michigan State University, he had a blocked punt.

As a junior, he set the school single-season record for punt average (45.6 yards), ranking second in the Pac-10 and sixth nationally.

As a senior, he recorded a 44.2 punt average (fifth in school history). He finished second in school history and sixth in Pac-12 conference history in career gross punting average. He became the second player in school history to receive first-team all-conference honors for three consecutive seasons, matching Alex Mack (2006-08) achievement. He was invited to the 2012 East–West Shrine Game, where he averaged 60.0 yards per punt on three attempts for the West team.

In four years he never missed a game (51), totaling 255 punts for 11,094 yards, 72 punts of 50 or more yards, 90 punts downed inside the 20, a 43.5 average and a 38.2 net average.

Collegiate statistics

Professional career

Jacksonville Jaguars 
Anger was selected in the third round (70th overall) of the 2012 NFL Draft. He became the highest drafted punter since Todd Sauerbrun was chosen 56th overall in 1995, and the first punter drafted by the Jaguars since 2007. A day later on April 29, the Jaguars cut punters Nick Harris and Spencer Lanning. Like Anger, Harris also played collegiately at California.

As a rookie, he averaged 47.8 yards per punt and was second in the league with a 40.8 net punt average. He was named to All-Rookie teams by CBS Sports, ESPN, Pro Football Weekly and many other media outlets. Anger also received a vote for the 2012 All-Pro Team as voted on by the Associated Press.

In 2013, he ranked second in the league in punting yards.

In 2014, he led the league in yards per punt and punting yards.

In 2013, he ranked second in the league in punting yards. At the time he ranked second in league history with a career punt average of 46.8 yards.

Tampa Bay Buccaneers 
On March 22, 2016, Anger signed a one-year contract with the Tampa Bay Buccaneers. Anger won the starting punting job after the team released Jake Schum.

On December 31, 2016, Anger signed a five-year, $17 million contract extension with the Buccaneers through the 2021 season. In the 2018 season, Anger had 57 punts for 2,567 for a 45.04 average.

On March 13, 2019, Anger was released by the Buccaneers. He played in all 48 games, hitting 192 punts with a 45-yard average.

Houston Texans 
On July 23, 2019, Anger signed with the Houston Texans. On August 30, 2019, Anger was released. He was re-signed on September 17, 2019. On December 28, 2019, Anger was signed to a three-year contract extension.

On March 18, 2021, Anger was released by the Texans.

Dallas Cowboys
Anger was signed by the Dallas Cowboys to a one-year contract on April 7, 2021. He was named for the 2022 Pro Bowl, his first selection. He was also named second-team All-Pro.

On March 22, 2022, Anger re-signed with the Cowboys on a three-year, $9 million contract.

Personal life
Shortly after Anger was selected by the Jaguars, NFL Network host Rich Eisen exclaimed that "Punters are people too!". Eisen had Anger as a guest on his podcast and presented him with a shirt containing that exclamation. Nevertheless, the Jaguars have received much criticism from fans and football experts for drafting a punter ahead of future Super Bowl winning quarterback Russell Wilson, although the Jaguars publicly said that they never considered drafting Wilson due to having 2011 first-round pick Blaine Gabbert.

Due to his powerful leg, Anger's Jacksonville teammates gave him the nickname Banger.

References

External links
California Golden Bears bio
Tampa Bay Buccaneers bio
Jacksonville Jaguars bio

1988 births
Living people
People from Camarillo, California
Players of American football from California
Sportspeople from Ventura County, California
American football punters
California Golden Bears football players
Jacksonville Jaguars players
Tampa Bay Buccaneers players
Houston Texans players
Dallas Cowboys players